Barry Andrews may refer to:

Barry Andrews (actor) (born 1944), British actor
Barry Andrews (rugby league) (born 1950), Australian rugby league player
Barry Andrews (musician) (born 1956), English vocalist and keyboardist with XTC and Shriekback
Barry Andrews (politician) (born 1967), Irish Fianna Fáil politician and former CEO of GOAL